Mario Vitali (8 February 1914 – 3 June 1979) was an Italian bobsledder who competed in the late 1940s. At the 1948 Winter Olympics in St. Moritz, he finished sixth in the two-man event.

References

1948 bobsleigh two-man results
Bobsleigh two-man results: 1932-56 and since 1964 
Mario Vitali at Sports Reference.com

1914 births
1979 deaths
Olympic bobsledders of Italy
Bobsledders at the 1948 Winter Olympics
Italian male bobsledders